Coronel Rosales Partido is a partido on the southern coast of Buenos Aires Province in Argentina.

Attractions
The coastal village of Pehuen Có is popular with tourists from Gran Buenos Aires and it benefits from a beautiful beach, woodlands, a shipwreck, and some interesting fossils.

Sport
The city of Punta Alta is home to Sporting Punta Alta, a football club that play in the regionalised 4th Division of Argentinian football.

Settlements
Punta Alta, 57,296
Bajo Hondo 165
Calderón (Rosales)
Paso Mayor
Pehuen Có 674
Villa del Mar, 353	
Villa General Arias, 1,777

External links
Pehuen Có website 

1948 establishments in Argentina
Partidos of Buenos Aires Province